Travistan is Travis Morrison's solo debut album, released in 2004 by Barsuk Records. The record is named after the van that Morrison rode in during his former band The Dismemberment Plan's last tour.

Reception

Travistan received mixed reviews. It currently has a 56 out of 100 on the review aggregate site Metacritic, indicating "Mixed or average reviews."

The album is often noted in discussions of the music journalism website Pitchfork, as it marked one of the first moments when, after establishing itself as a critical powerhouse, the e-zine turned on an artist to whom it had previously given enthusiastic support. The album was one of the rare albums to get a 0.0 rating, with reviewer Chris Dahlen describing the album as "one of the most colossal trainwrecks in indie rock history." Barsuk Records co-founder Josh Rosenfeld described the effects of the review as "immediate and disastrous"; Pitchforks managing editor later said that the site had become more careful in issuing very negative reviews as a result.

Responding to Pitchforks review, Morrison said:

Other critical reviews compared the album negatively to work of Morrison's previous band The Dismemberment Plan. Zeth Lundy of PopMatters wrote, "This is quite literally as disappointing as records get, made all the more so by Morrison's solid resume with the Dismemberment Plan." Lundy singled out the tracks "Get Me Off This Coin", "My Two Front Teeth, Parts 2 and 3" and "Song for the Orca" for criticism.

Not all reviews were negative, though. Noel Murray of The A.V. Club wrote "Travistan is odd but oddly listenable, with a bright mood sparked by Morrison's spirit of discovery. It's one extended, refreshing 'Why not?'." Stylus Magazines Anthony Miccio, in response to the album's criticism, wrote, "After hearing the crap people have said about this album I'm bummed that people are so quick to reject what doesn't fit their immediate logic. It's ironic that folks would get off on shredding an album that's about trying to be kind and honest at the same time."

Track listing

Personnel
Credits adapted from AllMusic.

 Travis Morrison – bass guitar, drum machine, guitar, melodica, organ, percussion, piano, sampling, synthesizer, xylophone
 Phil Brazena – violin
 Dan Doggett – double bass
 Mike Dugan – bass guitar, drum machine, guitar, melodica, organ, percussion, piano, sampling, synthesizer, xylophone
 Amanda Fazzone – choir, chorus
 Megan Katcher – viola
 Josh LeBar – double bass
 Corinne Lynch – viola
 Jason McGerr – drums
 Kendall Nordin – choir, chorus
 Tiffany Shanta – violin
 Travistani National String Orchestra – strings
 Travistani Women's Chorus – choir, chorus
 Sean Urban – violin
 John Vanderslice – background vocals
 Christopher Walla – audio production, bass, drum machine, guitar, melodica, organ, percussion, piano, producer, sampling, synthesizer, xylophone
 Don Zientara – audio production, producer

References

External links
Barsuk Record's page on Travistan

2004 debut albums
Barsuk Records albums
Travis Morrison albums
Albums produced by Chris Walla